The Peanut Butter Solution (French title: Opération beurre de pinottes) is a 1985 Canadian children's fantasy film directed by Michael Rubbo. The second installment in the Tales for All (Contes Pour Tous) series of films by Les Productions La Fête, the film stars Mathew Mackay, Siluck Saysanasy, Alison Darcy, and Michael Hogan.

Plot
Michael Baskin is an average 11-year-old boy. His father, Billy Baskin, is a struggling artist and temporary sole caregiver of the children while his wife attends to the estate of her recently deceased father in Australia. Upon hearing the news that an abandoned mansion has recently burned down, Michael and his friend Connie decide to explore the remains. Outside the mansion, Connie dares Michael to take a look inside, leading to a frightening encounter with the ghosts of its homeless inhabitants who had died in the fire. Michael does not know this yet, but his fearsome run in with the ghosts has given him a mysterious illness simply known as "The Fright". Michael wakes up the next morning to find out that "The Fright" has made him lose all of his hair. After a failed attempt with a wig (his wig was pulled off by an older boy during a fight in a soccer game), the ghosts visit Michael in his sleep and give him the recipe of a magical formula for hair growth, the main ingredient of which is peanut butter. Michael's first attempt to make the formula is thwarted when his father and sister think he is making something to ingest (rather than use topically) and dispose of it.

The ghosts return the following night, giving themselves a second chance to pay him back for giving his money to some homeless people, and also give Michael special instruction not to add too much peanut butter, as it will end in dreadful results. Michael successfully makes the formula this time, but ignores their instructions not to overdo the peanut butter, and wakes up the next morning to find that his new hair has already begun to grow. After only a few minutes, Michael has grown a full head of hair. Suspicious of his fast growing follicles, Connie confronts Michael about his unusual ability. When Michael reveals to him his concoction, Connie decides to apply some to his pubic area, in an attempt to create the illusion that he's going through puberty. Connie soon discovers that the joke is on him. Pretty soon, Michael and Connie's hair grows to such lengths that it has become a nuisance for the school and their classmates, resulting in their suspensions. While Michael frantically searches for a solution, Connie discovers that the hair will stop growing by yelling at it.

The art teacher at Michael's school, simply called the Signor, frightens children and forbids them from using their imagination. After getting fired from the school, the Signor finds out about Michael's condition and kidnaps him (and many other neighborhood children) to make magic paint brushes from Michael's ever-growing hair, in which he subdues Michael with a knockout drug. The kidnapped children are put to work under tough conditions ("We have to make 500 brushes a day, or we don't eat!"). The paintbrushes are so powerful that they paint whatever their user imagines without need for detail or neatness. Connie, and Michael's sister, Suzie, discover the Signor's magical paintbrush factory and try to rescue Michael and the other kids. Connie tries to use force, but he is overpowered by Signor and his dog James. Instead, Connie tricks the Signor into painting a picture of the abandoned mansion. Connie then dares him to investigate inside, leading "The Fright" to be passed on from Michael to the Signor. The Signor, now bald, escapes from the haunted house and chases the children, locking them up. Just as Connie is about to escape with Michael, Susan and their dad find the factory and the Signor is arrested by the local police.

The film ends with the family reunited as the mother has returned home, and Michael's hair has stopped growing out of control.

Cast

Production
The original working title of the film was Michael's Fright.
This film features the first English-language songs performed by Céline Dion (Listen to the Magic Man and Michael's Song). The French-language version of the film features French-language versions of the same songs (Dans la main d'un magicien and La ballade de Michel).
Skippy peanut-butter paid for prominent product placement in the film.

Home media
The Peanut Butter Solution has been released on home video numerous times.

In the United States, the film had been released only on VHS (through New World Video, Anchor Bay, and Starmaker Entertainment) until 2019 [see below].

In Canada, the film was released on DVD in 2006, as part of box set with five other Tales for All films. Another box set, with every Tales for All movie, was released in 2011. In 2012, the movie was released separately. All of these DVD releases were in French only.

In 2013, the movie was transferred to high definition from the original 35mm camera negative. This transfer was used for a Blu-ray release in Canada on April 11, 2017, and includes both French and English language tracks.

On December 10, 2019, Severin Films released it for the first time on DVD/Blu-ray in the US as the first offering of their new Severin Kids label. This release includes an "extended version" with 3 minutes of extra scenes.

References

External links

Official Website
Review at Canuxploitation
Productions La Fête Official Production Company Website
Severin Kids

1985 films
1985 independent films
1980s children's fantasy films
Canadian children's fantasy films
Canadian ghost films
Canadian independent films
Dark fantasy films
English-language Canadian films
Films about child abduction
Films about families
Films about fear
Films about friendship
Films directed by Michael Rubbo
Films set in Montreal
Films shot in Montreal
New World Pictures films
Quebec films
French-language Canadian films
1980s Canadian films